Lioponera elegans, formerly Cerapachys elegans, is an dorline ant species found in Australia.

References

Dorylinae
Insects described in 1918
Hymenoptera of Australia